This is a character guide to the radio drama, film, manga and anime works Kerberos saga (ケルベロス・サーガ, keruberosu saga). Characters are sorted by organizations or groups according to the original works. The English adaptation equivalents are mentioned when available.

Metropolitan Security Police Organization (MP)

The  is a paramilitary counter-terrorist police force established separately from the Self-Defense Forces and the regular police in order to combat terrorism and maintain order in the capital. The plot synopsis provided in Japanese editions of Kerberos Panzer Cop renders the English name of the organization as "Metropolitan Police", abbreviated "MP". The 1994 English adaptation of the manga, Hellhounds, uses the term "CAPO" (for "Capital Police"). The English release of Jin-Roh uses the term 'Capital Police' throughout.

Metropolitan Police Defense Division

The Metropolitan Police Defense Division (首都警・警備部, shutokei keibibu, lit. 'capital police security division'), directed by Isao Aniya, is the main armed branch of the MP, tasked with maintaining public order. It maintains an armored infantry force (the Special Armed Garrison), a helicopter unit, armored cars, and a sniper team.

Special Armed Garrison "Kerberos"

The Special Armed Garrison (首都警・特機隊 ~ケルベロス~, shutokei tokki-tai ~keruberosu~, lit. 'capital police special equipment unit') is the core unit of the MP. Headed by Shirou Tatsumi, this garrison is in charge of Tokyo's public peace and order. Its members wear special military armor suits (the Protect Gear) and are armed with machine guns. Notable members include Koichi Todome, Soichiro Toribe, Midori Washio, Inui and Kazuki Fuze. The English release of Jin-Roh uses the term 'Special Unit' to refer to this formation.

Jin-Roh

"Jin-Roh" (人狼, jinrō, lit. 'man-wolf') is a secret counterespionage unit formed inside the Special Armed Garrison to protect its existence from threats inside the government security apparatus. Hajime Handa is the head of the Jin-Roh group. In the English release of 'Jin-Roh', the unit is referred to as the 'Wolf Brigade'.

Metropolitan Police Public Security Division

The , directed by Bunmei Muroto, is the other branch of the MP, specializing in intelligence-gathering and espionage. It is the rival unit to Tatsumi's Special Armed Garrison.

Japan Ground Self-Defense Force

1st Airborne Brigade
Panzer Jäger Unit (ギア部隊) a.k.a. Armored Soldier (機甲隊員), the military equivalent of the MP's Special Unit. Armed with antitank rifles.
Tetsurō Kai
Original name: Kai Tetsurou (甲斐哲朗)
Aliases: -
Age: -
Cast: -
Appearances: Kerberos Panzer Cop - Part II (Act 5 and Act 8).
Originally from the JGSDF's 1st Airborne Brigade, Tetsurō Kai is the leader of the JSDF's new Protect Gear unit. In Kerberos Panzer Cop Act 5 he appears as a trainee of the Metropolitan Police Special Armed Garrison's Academy Training School "Zucht Schanze". Tetsurō Kai is impressed by his instructor Midori Washio, so after completing his session, the young man sends her an invite to the JGSDF public exhibition held in the Mount Fuji from December 17 to 20 of 19XX. Curious, she goes to the parade with her fellow instructor Hachiro Tohbe and met there Tetsurō Kai wearing the Panzer Jäger full-body armor Type 61 Protect Gear. In Act 8, Kai's unit is called in to put an end to Kerberos Uprising.

Anti-government urban guerrilla organizations
Hanseifu soshiki toshi gerira: Anti-government groups that appeared as a response to national economic growth policies. With the end of the occupation period, the country had entered internationalization under a forced economic re-organization of the whole society. Re-organization caused massive unemployment and floods of poverty appeared in the capital slums. Vicious organized crime and black market corruption increased rapidly as did the ranks of opposition parties. A part of the population refused the new society and started to protest in the capital. In order to protect the institutions, the government answered with police repression and authoritarian policies which worsened the situation, turning public protest movements into underground guerrilla groups resorting to sabotage and acts of terrorism. This would eventually lead to armed conflict within the capital metropolis.

Revolutionary Communist students
Revolutionary Communist student groups.
Kei Amemiya
Original name: Amemiya Kei (雨宮圭)
Aliases: Langhaar (Long Hairs)
Age: 17~18
Cast: Sumi Mutoh (武藤寿美)
Appearances: Jin-Roh

Reiko
Original name: Reiko (レイコ)
Aliases: -
Age: -
Cast: -
Appearances: Kerberos Saga Rainy Dogs (Act 3)

Sect
The Sect (セクト, sekuto) emerged from forbidden anti-government leftist party cells and became an organized terrorist group engaged in guerrilla warfare with the police. The Sect uses the Tokyo sewers to transport and store firearms and explosives. Teenage girls nicknamed Little Red Riding Hoods are used as bomb carriers. The Special Armed Garrison was created by the government to get rid of the Sect activities.
Nanami Agawa
Original name: Agawa Nanami (阿川七生)
Aliases: Kurzhaar (Short Hairs)
Age: -
Cast: Eri Sendai (仙台エリ)
Appearances: Jin-Roh
An adolescent girl used by the Sect's Division Jacobson (ヤコブソン機関) to transport satchel charges without being suspected, nor checked, by the police patrols. While discovered in the sewers by the Kerberos brigadier Kazuki Fuze, she ducked her bomb and committed suicide in front of him causing heavy damages in Tokyo, heavy criticism against the Special Armed Garrison and an investigation about Kazuki Fuse.

Aliases: Foxy Croquette O-Gin, Young Lady
Original name: Ketsune Korokke Ogin
Age: -
Cast: Mako Hyodo
Appearances: The Red Spectacles, Kerberos & Tachiguishi
While she was a teenager, Foxy Croquette used to be a Little Red Riding Hood courier for the Sect when she was busted by a platoon of Kerberos. Brought to the Public Security Division headquarters she was used as a mole by Bunmei Muroto.

Kusaba
Original name: Kusaba (草場)
Aliases: -
Age: -
Cast: -
Appearances: Kerberos Panzer Cop Act.2
Kusaba is a saboteur who infiltrates the Transport Company's Aeronautical Experiments Platoon (航空実験小隊) to sabotage the Jagdhund assault helicopter newly delivered to the Special Armed Garrison. Even though he gets into Hachiro Kishu he eventually betrays him by ruining the latter's dream.

Four Seasons League
The Four Seasons League (四季協会, shiki kyokai) is an ultra-leftist terrorist group with members originating from the Sect. Its background and modus operandi resembles those of the real-life Japanese Red Army.
Kazuya Fujiwara
Original name: Fujiwara Kazuya (藤原 和也)
Aliases: -
Age: 28
Cast: -
Appearances: Kerberos Panzer Cop Part I
Fujiwara is the leader of the Lufthansa flight 666 hijacking group. Surviving the aircraft crash on Showa Island landfill no.8 he was shot dead by Midori Washio before he could be apprehended by the municipal police.

Middle-East guerrillas
AK Ginko
Aliases: Foxy Croquette O-Gin, Young Lady
Original name: AK no Ginko (AKの銀子)
Age: -
Cast: Mako Hyodo
Appearances: Tachiguishi-Retsuden, Onna-Tachiguishi Retsuden
After the National Diet Building incident, Foxy Croquette O-Gin disappeared from the streets of Tokyo and reappeared later in Palestine as a guerrilla known as AK Ginko.

ANPO Hantai
Sabu
Aliases: Sabuchan
Original name: Sabu (サブちゃん)
Age: -
Cast:
Appearances: Kerberos & Tachiguishi
Sabuchan is a boy fascinated by the Anpo Protests and supports them even though he is still a child.

Little Red Riding Hoods 
Akazukin: young female characters dressed in red, like in the Little Red Riding Hood tale. There is an explicit reference to the Grimm brothers version in Jin-Roh as a German written Rotkäppchen book. However the tale version narrated in the anime is a composite version based on pre-Grimm oral versions, notably on Charles Perrault's Le Petit Chaperon Rouge. In Jin-Roh, Akazukin is the nickname used by Bunmei Muroto to designate female bomb carriers of the Sect. Little Red Riding Hoods are active within the Sect's logistics organization, called "Division Jacobson".
Young Lady
Original name: Shōjo / Shoujo (少女)
Aliases: Foxy Croquette O-Gin, AK Ginko, Young Lady of Fate (運命の少女, Unmei no Shoujo)
Age: -
Cast: Mako Hyodo
The young Lady is first appearing as a mysterious mute character who leads Koichi Todome through Tokyo in The Red Spectacles. The original theatrical trailer introduces her as an allegory for fate (運命,unmei) in the meaning of fatum. In Kerberos & Tachiguishi the character's backstory is eventually revealed, as a teenager she was caught by a Kerberos patrol while she was delivering bombs as a Sect Little Red Riding Hood. As a Division Jacobson terrorist she was brought to the Metropolitan Police Public Security Division's headquarters and was selected by Bunmei Muroto to become a mole.

Fast Food Grifters
(Tachiguishi)
Moongaze Ginji
Original name: Tsukimi no Ginji (月見の銀二)
Aliases: Moon-viewing Ginji
Era: 1902~1945
Cast: Hideyo Amamoto, Kaito Kisshoji
A famous Fast Food Grifter and an old friend of Koichi Todome.

Foxy Croquette O-Gin
Original name: Ketsune Korokke no Ogin (ケツネコロッケのお銀)
Aliases: Oginsan (お銀さん), Young Lady, AK Ginko
Era: 1946~1960
Cast: Mako Hyodo
Crying Inumaru
Original name: Naki no Inumaru (哭きの犬丸)
Aliases: -
Era: 1961~1964
Cast: Mitsuhisa Ishikawa
Cold Badger Masa
Original name: Hiyashi Tanuki no Masa (冷しタヌキの政)
Aliases: -
Era: 1965~1970
Cast: Toshio Suzuki
Beefbowl Ushigoro
Original name: Gyudon no Ushi-Goro (牛丼の牛五郎)
Aliases: -
Era: 1965~1970
Cast: Shinji Higuchi
Hamburger Tetsu
Original name: Hanbāgā no Tetsu (ハンバーガーの哲)
Aliases: -
Era: 1971~1980
Cast: Kenji Kawai
Frankfurter Tatsu
Original name: Furankufuruto no Tatsu (フランクフルトの辰)
Aliases: -
Era: 1977~1983
Cast: Katsuya Terada
Medium Hot Sabu
Original name: Chu-Kara no Sabu (中辛のサブ)
Aliases: -
Era: 1984~2006
Cast: Shoji Kawamori
Baked Bean Pastry Amataro
Original name: -
Aliases: -
Cast: -
Era: -
Crepe Mami
Original name: Kurepu no mami (クレープのマミ)
Aliases: -
Era: -
Cast -

Tokyo Metropolitan Police
Due to the increasing violence of paramilitary anti-government groups, the Tokyo Metropolitan Police soon became unable to maintain public order, leading to the establishment of the Capital Police (the Shutokei). As a result, the two police forces have significant overlap in jurisdiction and have an uneasy relationship. In 'Kerberos Panzer Cop', the regular police are represented by the Tokyo Metropolitan Police' (自治体 Keishi-cho). 'Jin-Roh', however, is set during the 1950s, prior to the 1954 police reorganization. Thus, the regular police are Tokyo's Municipal Police (自治体 Jichi-kei).

Metropolitan Police Department

Keishicho: Metropolitan Police Department.
MPD Guard Division (警視庁警備部)
2nd Riot Battalion (警視庁・機動隊)
Communications Support Team
5th Riot Battalion
1st Company
2nd Company
6th Riot Battalion (第六機動隊)
Assault Team
The Assault Team is stationed on Katsushima island.
Toru Inui
Medical Platoon
MPD Public Security Division (警視庁公安部)

German Armed Forces (Reichswehr)
Nazi Germany's armed forces are the main protagonists in the Kerberos Panzer Jäger radio drama series. Because of the coup against the Nazi regime that restores the Weimar government, the German forces are once again referred to as the Reichswehr in the radio drama.

808th Propagandakompanie
(Dai 808 Senden Chutai)
Cpt. Maki Stauffenberg
Aliases: -
Original name: Maki Shutaufenberuku Taii (マキ・シュタウフェンヴェルク大尉)
Cast: Yoshiko Sakakibara
Appearances: Kerberos Panzer Jäger
In September 1942, the Captain Maki of the 808th German Propaganda Company (808th Propagandakompanie, 第808宣伝中隊) leaves the Warsaw station to deliver Protect-Gear parts to the 101st Panzer Company fighting the Soviet Army at the Battle of Stalingrad.

Other characters
Manager Kamiyama
Original name: -
Cast: Kenji Kamiyama
Appearances: Tachiguishi-Retsuden

Tang Mie
Original name: Tan Mi (唐密, タンミー)
Cast: Sue Eaching
Appearances: StrayDog
Tang Mie is a Taiwanese girl that used to live with Koichi Todome when the latter flew to Taipei during his post-Kerberos Riot three-years-long exile. When paroled Inui left Tokyo to find the track of his former leader/master Koichi Todome instead he bumps into Tang Mie and befriend with her. Shortly the pair leaves the condo and travel Taiwan after Koichi Todome. When they eventually find him at Tainan, the former elite Kerberos panzer cop has become a peaceful peasant inviting them to start their life anew living in a ménage à trois. Later Inui leaves the home to meet Hayashi and his own lethal destiny, thereafter Koichi, who also left the home ("the roost"), turns back to Tokyo leaving behind Tang Mie and eventually facing his death (see The Red Spectacles). Tang Mie enjoys a Platonic love relationship with both Koichi and Inui; Koichi reveals to Inui that "she was her who picked up both of [them]".

Tokumitsu Shinada
Original name: -
Cast: Fuyuki Shinada
Appearances: Tachiguishi-Retsuden

Papa's Waitress
Original name: Papa no wueitoresu (パパスのウェイトレス)
Aliases: Neechan (ネエちゃん)
Cast: -
Appearances: Kerberos Saga: Rainy Dogs (The Killers)
Papa's Lunch Room Waitress is a main character in The Killers short story published in Kerberos Saga: Rainy Dogs. She talks to the two killers searching for Koichi Todome.

Cameo characters
Detective Takahiro Matsui
Original name: Matsui Takahiro (松井 孝弘)
Cast: -
Appearances: Kerberos Panzer Cop Act.6
Original work: Patlabor: The Movie
Detective Matsui from Patlabor is hired to solve the "Fast Food Grifter Clubbed to Death Case" (マッハ軒立食師撲殺事件異聞) involving Fast Food Grifter (or "Tachiguishi") Cold Badger Masa and the Special Armed Garrison's Chuichi Koshiramaru 2nd Company, 7th Platoon. A part of the Kerberos saga staff, called Headgear, worked on the Patlabor TV series and feature films, including its creator, Mamoru Oshii, who directed two feature films respectively in 1989 and 1993.

Golgo 13
Original name: Togo 13 (東郷十三)
Cast: -
Appearances: The Killers (from Kerberos Saga Rainy Dogs)
Original work: Golgo 13
Golgo 13 a.k.a. Duke Togo (デューク東郷), which is a mysterious identity professional assassin, appears among the killers in the bar restaurant called Papa's Lunch Room. While he's waiting at a table, a boy enters the bar delivering a large packet and asking to the crowd "Mister Togo 13, please?" ("東郷十三さん......いますか？", p. 362), "that's over here" ("掩だ", p. 362) he answers. Then he pays the boy, gets the present that comes with a happy birthday card and heads to the toilet with the packet. He later reappears smoking a cigarette, wearing mittens and holding his famous M16 rifle. A firing ensues between the five killers, Golgo 13 headshots the man in black with the two automatic pistols while the latter shoot him dead with multiple gunshots in the chest. The Killers is a short story that was published prior to the release of the Kerberos Saga Rainy Dogs manga series in Ace Tokunoh comic magazine in 2003. This short story by Mamoru Oshii and illustrator Mamoru Sugiura was added as an epilogue in the tankōbon (compilation volume) of Kerberos Saga Rainy Dogs published in 2005.

References

 Kerberos saga official website (Japanese)
 Production I.G official English website (English)
 Kenji Kawai official English website (English)
 GA Graphic official website (Japanese)
 Production I.G Special Site (Japanese)
 Kerberos Panzer Jäger official website (Japanese)
 Tachiguishi-Retsuden official website  (Japanese)
 Kerberos Panzer Jäger@Raiden Kinema channel 2 (Japanese)
 Kerberos Panzer Jäger@Raiden Kinema channel 9 (Japanese)
 Mamoru Oshii's official website (Japanese)
 Jin-Roh DTS Edition booklet, Bandai Visual (Japanese)
 Jin-Roh Maniaxx, Kadokawa Shoten,  (Japanese)
 Kenrou Densetsu, Nihon Shuppansha,  (Japanese)
 Kenrou Densetsu Fukyoban, Nihon Shuppansha,  (Japanese)
 Hellhounds Panzer Cops, Dark Horse Comics,  (English)
 Kerberos Panzer Cop: Conclusion, Kadokawa Shoten,  (Japanese)
 StrayDog: Kerberos Panzer Cop DVD, Bandai Entertainment, (Japanese/English)
 The Red Spectacles DVD, Bandai Entertainment, (Japanese/English)
 Jin-Roh: La Brigade des Loups DVD, CTV International, (Japanese/French)

External links
 Kerberos saga official website (Japanese)

Characters
Kerberos saga
Jin-Roh
Anime and manga articles needing expert attention
Lists of anime and manga characters